Alaginayagipuram is a village in the Pattukkottai taluk of Thanjavur district, Tamil Nadu, India.Social service team in alagiyanayagipuram named as SSV GROUPS

Demographics 

As per the 2001 census, Alaginayagipuram had a total population of 633 with 303 males and 330 females. The sex ratio was 1.089. The literacy rate was 73.2.

References 

 

Villages in Thanjavur district